The Brick House on Shun Pike, near Nicholasville, Kentucky, was listed on the National Register of Historic Places in 1984.

The house is a five-bay one-story brick central passage plan house, with an original brick ell and brick end chimneys.  The brickwork is Flemish bond.  It has high quality Federal-style interior woodwork.

It is located off what is now Kentucky Route 1268.

References

National Register of Historic Places in Jessamine County, Kentucky
Federal architecture in Kentucky
Houses in Jessamine County, Kentucky
Houses on the National Register of Historic Places in Kentucky
Central-passage houses